George William Passmore (August 24, 1889 – September 22, 1952) was an American lacrosse player who competed in the 1904 Summer Olympics. He was born in St. Louis, Missouri and died in Florissant, Missouri.

In 1904 he became a member of the St. Louis Amateur Athletic Association which won the silver medal in the lacrosse tournament. His older brother William was also on the team.

References

1889 births
1952 deaths
American lacrosse players
Olympic silver medalists for the United States in lacrosse
Lacrosse players at the 1904 Summer Olympics
Medalists at the 1904 Summer Olympics